"You Could've Been a Lady" is a song by the British soul band Hot Chocolate, written by Errol Brown and Tony Wilson. Written in 1969 and released as a single in 1971, it peaked at number 22 on the UK Singles Chart during a nine-week run.

Although initially released by Hot Chocolate as a non-album single, the song later appeared on the 2009 reissue of Cicero Park.

In 1976, the band re-recorded the song for their Man to Man album. Boasting a fuller, heavier production than the 3:42 original, it runs for 4:25. Rather than the original single version, a 3:48 edit of the re-recording has appeared on all compilation albums issued both by the band and with various other artists.

Though uncredited, "You Could've Been a Lady" borrows heavily from "Why Don't You Quit" by American jazz musician Eddie Harris.

April Wine version

The song had further success in North America when it was covered by Canadian rock band April Wine for their 1972 studio album, On Record. Released as the album's first single, it was their first hit, reaching number two on the RPM 100 in Canada and number 32 on the Billboard Hot 100 in the United States.

References

Hot Chocolate (band) songs
April Wine songs
1971 singles
1972 singles
Songs written by Errol Brown
RAK Records singles
Big Tree Records singles
1969 songs
Songs written by Tony Wilson (musician)